Backhousia angustifolia, with common name narrow leaf myrtle, is a flowering plant in the family Myrtaceae, native to Queensland and northeastern New South Wales.

References

angustifolia
Flora of Queensland
Myrtales of Australia
Trees of Australia
Taxa named by Ferdinand von Mueller